Spring Green Primitive Baptist Church is a historic Primitive Baptist church located near Hamilton, Martin County, North Carolina. It was built in 1878, and is a front-gable, frame building with late Greek Revival style design elements.  The building measures 36 feet, 4 inches, wide and 55 feet, 4 1/2 inches deep.  Also on the property is the contributing church cemetery.

It was added to the National Register of Historic Places in 2005.

References

Baptist churches in North Carolina
Churches on the National Register of Historic Places in North Carolina
Greek Revival church buildings in North Carolina
Churches completed in 1878
19th-century Baptist churches in the United States
Churches in Martin County, North Carolina
National Register of Historic Places in Martin County, North Carolina
Wooden churches in North Carolina
Primitive Baptists